Cho Yoon-ok (25 February 1940 – 22 June 2002) was a South Korean football player and manager. Considered one of Asia's greatest inside forwards in the 1960s, Cho led South Korea to an AFC Asian Cup title. He also participated at the 1964 Summer Olympics.

Honours
ROK Army CIC
Korean President's Cup: 1961

Korea Tungsten
Korean Semi-professional League (Spring): 1968
Korean Semi-professional League (Autumn): 1966
Korean National Championship runner-up: 1968
Korean President's Cup: 1966

South Korea U20
AFC Youth Championship: 1959, 1960

South Korea
AFC Asian Cup: 1960
Asian Games silver medal: 1962

Individual
AFC Asian Cup top goalscorer: 1960
AFC Asian All Stars: 1965, 1966, 1967
Korean FA Player of the Year: 1965

References

External links
 
 

1940 births
Association football forwards
South Korean footballers
1960 AFC Asian Cup players
Footballers at the 1964 Summer Olympics
AFC Asian Cup-winning players
Olympic footballers of South Korea
South Korean football managers
Busan IPark managers
2002 deaths
Asian Games medalists in football
Footballers at the 1962 Asian Games
Kyung Hee University alumni
Footballers from Seoul
Asian Games silver medalists for South Korea
Association football midfielders
Medalists at the 1962 Asian Games
South Korea international footballers